The Croatian Civil Aviation Agency (CCAA) is the civil aviation agency of Croatia. Its head office is in Zagreb.

References

External links

  

Croatia
Government of Croatia
Civil aviation in Croatia
Transport organizations based in Croatia